The 11th Vanier Cup was played on November 21, 1975, at Exhibition Stadium in Toronto, Ontario, and decided the CIAU football champion for the 1975 season. The Ottawa Gee-Gees won their first championship by defeating the Calgary Dinos by a score of 14-9. The Gee-Gees became the first team to win the Vanier Cup without having endured a single loss in the regular season.

References

External links
 Official website

Vanier Cup
Vanier Cup
1975 in Toronto
November 1975 sports events in Canada